Atomos is the second album by ambient music duo A Winged Victory for the Sullen. The album was released on October 6, 2014 on the labels Erased Tapes and Kranky.

The album contains the music from Atomos, a dance piece by choreographer Wayne McGregor and his company Wayne McGregor Random Dance. The music was recorded in Summer 2013, in studios in Brussels, Berlin and Reykjavik. Regarding the recording process, pianist Dustin O'Halloran has commented: "We never imagined 2013 would be such an explosively creative year. The first record took us two years from start to finish, but in the micro span of time over last summer we were able to change the formula for the way we write, record, and let go. It was incredibly liberating." The dance piece premiered at Sadler's Wells, London, on 9 October 2013.

The album was preceded by the Atomos VII EP, which was released on April 28, 2014. Besides the title track, the EP also contained 'Minuet For A Cheap Piano Number One' (an outtake from the A Winged Victory for the Sullen album sessions) and a reinterpretation of 'Atomos VII' by Australian composer Ben Frost.

Track listing

Personnel

Charlotte Danhier - Cello
Francesco Donadello - Engineer, Mixing
Ben Frost	 - Engineer
Nayon Han - Cello
Christelle Heinen - Cello
Margaret Hermant - Harp, Violin
Arthur Hornig - Cello
Isabelle Klemt - Cello
Bo Kondren - Mastering
Neil Leiter - Viola
Craig McCaffrey - Artwork
Dustin O'Halloran - Arranger, Composer, Engineer, Primary Artist, Score
Sophie Bayet - Violin
Adam Bryanbaum Wiltzie	 - Arranger, Composer, Engineer, Primary Artist, Score
A Winged Victory for the Sullen - Primary Artist

Credits adapted from AllMusic.

References

2014 albums
A Winged Victory for the Sullen albums
Erased Tapes Records albums
Kranky albums